Rafael Leonardo Flores (born 24 April 1991) is a Dominican footballer who plays as a midfielder for Cibao FC and the Dominican Republic national team.

Honours
 Cibao
CFU Club Championship (1): 2017

References

1991 births
Living people
People from Hermanas Mirabal Province
Dominican Republic footballers
Dominican Republic international footballers
Dominican Republic expatriate footballers
Expatriate footballers in Haiti
Expatriate footballers in Antigua and Barbuda
Association football midfielders
Tempête FC players
Ligue Haïtienne players
Liga Dominicana de Fútbol players
Cibao FC players